Smt. Geeta Bhukkal (born 16 August 1968) is an Indian National Congress politician representing the Jhajjar Vidhan Sabha constituency in Haryana, India. 
She held Education, Health, Women & Child Development, Social Justice & Empowerment, Welfare of SCs & BCs, Industrial Training and Printing & Stationery as a Minister in the Haryana Cabinet.

Early life
Bhukkal was born to Sh. Rattan Singh Punia at Matanhail village in Jhajjar district of Haryana.

After completing her B.A. from Panjab University, Chandigarh, she did her post-graduate diploma in personnel management and industrial relations from D.A.V Management College, Chandigarh. Bhukkal also completed her bachelor of law degree from the University of Delhi and her bachelor in education from Maharishi Dayanand University, Rohtak and after that she went for an M.A. in political science.

Political career
Bhukkal was elected as a Member of Legislative Assembly for the first time from Kalayat Assembly Segment in 2005. She won this seat for the Indian National Congress for the first time in 37 years.

Following delimitation before the 2009 Assembly elections, she contested from the Jhajjar Assembly Segment in 2009, winning the election with a margin of over 28,000 votes. She was made the Cabinet Minister for Education & Languages, Social Justice & Empowerment, Welfare of Scheduled Castes/Backward Classes, Women & Child Development, Industrial Training, Archaeology & Museums, Archives, Health & Medical Education, and Printing & Stationery.

She won the 2014 Assembly election from the Jhajjar Assembly Segment with a margin of over 26,000 votes becoming the first M.L.A. from Jhajjar to have won a consecutive term and she even became first Education Minister to have won an election, creating a record of sorts.

She won the 2019 Assembly election from the Jhajjar Assembly Segment with a margin of over 15,000 votes becoming the first M.L.A. from Jhajjar to have won the seat three times in a row and making it a hat-trick of her winning in the Jhajjar Assembly Segment and also creating a streak of wins in the State Assembly elections by winning Fourth time in a row since 2005.

Smt. Bhukkal is also member of the All India Congress Committee (AICC).

Personal life
Bhukkal is married to Dr. D. S. Bhukkal, and they have 3 children.

Positions held
 Ex-Member, Executive Committee, Haryana Pradesh Congress Committee
 Ex-General Secretary, Haryana Pradesh Congress Committee (Legal Cell)
 Ex-Organizing Secretary, Haryana Pradesh Congress Committee
 Nominated Member of Commonwealth Parliamentary Association (India Branch) 24.10.2008
 Member, State Vigilance & Monitoring Committee, Haryana; Member, State Environment & Pollution Control Committee, Haryana (07.06.2006 to 06.06.2008)
 Member, Manifesto Committee, Haryana Pradesh Congress Committee
 Chairperson, Sub-Committee (National Level), Central Advisory Board of Education (CABE) for Extension of Right to Education Act to 10th & 10+2
 Chairperson, Sub-Committee (National Level), Central Advisory Board of Education (CABE) for Assessment & Implementation of Continuous and Comprehensive Evaluation (CCE) in the Context of the No Detention Provision in the Right of Children to Free and Compulsory Education Act, 2009
 Ex-Chairperson, Haryana Pradesh Congress Committee (Scheduled Castes Department)
 Member, All India Congress Committee

References 

1968 births
Living people
Indian National Congress politicians from Haryana
Haryana MLAs 2019–2024
Haryana MLAs 2014–2019